Comet is a 2014 American romantic comedy-drama film directed and written by Sam Esmail. The film stars Emmy Rossum and Justin Long. The film had its world premiere at LA Film Festival on June 13, 2014. It was released on December 5, 2014, by IFC Films.

After meeting by chance at a meteor shower, pessimist Dell and insightful Kimberly begin a six-year journey of a relationship. The film is shown through glimpses of parallel universes and flashbacks that are not chronologically ordered, showing the viewer the ebb and flow of their intricate relationship.

Plot
A nervous Dell, dressed in a suit, fidgets with a bouquet of flowers as he anxiously awaits an answer to his knock.

Dell flashes back six years, he's waiting in a long line in LA to get a spot in the cemetery to watch the meteor shower. Interacting with the teenager in front of him, we learn that his mother has been diagnosed with liver cancer, he works for a pharmaceutical company and is a narcissist. 

Dumbstruck, like a deer in headlights by a woman's eyes, she warns him to get out the path of a speeding car. She is Kimberly, and her date's constant banter irritates Dell and soon he asks her for her number. Josh comes at him, so he backs off, but not before Dell can give him a few verbal jabs and pique her interest. 

Dell flashes forward two years, where he and Kimberly are in a hotel room, preparing to attend her friend's wedding in Paris. She's frustrated as she needs their relationship to evolve to consider kids. 

Back at the meteorite shower, Dell is in the dark, muttering to himself, describing her as beyond beautiful, real, perfect, funny and crazy as Kimberly bumps into him again. This time he tags alongside her, insisting they keep talking. Dell confesses that earlier, he had been telling himself aloud, ″Don't miss her,″ an example of his pessimistic foreboding of what might happen in five minutes. In contrast, Kimberly is focused on enjoying the moment, the now, as in being out in the open air under the stars. She shakes his offered hand, agreeing to trying out a relationship.

Flash forward to Paris, Kimberly is anguished thinking of their future. As he has pulled out an engagement ring and gets down on one knee, she's saying that when he says he  loves her it doesn't sound genuine. He quickly stands, before she can see him, sliding the ring back into his pocket. 

Forward one year after their first breakup, we see Dell stalking Kimberly, buying train tickets on the same train heading north. Timeline back to Paris, the pair are hot and then cold. Dell frantically recovers the ring after it slid out of his pocket. She asks what he's hiding, but he doesn't tell. On the train again, Kimberly grows to trust him again, shortly before he's asked to disembark halfway before the original destination. 

Small snipets of a mobile phone conversation between Dell in NYC and Kimberly in LA are interspersed between the train and Paris flashbacks. He hears in her voice that she's being untruthful. She confesses she's been on and off texting with Jack, the man she'd briefly dated after their first breakup. Upset, Dell is who does the breaking up, claiming to have never loved her, trying to inflict pain. Directly afterwards, a nurse calls Dell to inform him that his mother, who he'd saved from nearly fatal liver cancer four years ago, passed away from a heart attack.

In the Paris hotel room, Dell sits Kimberley on the bed. Silencing her negative thoughts, he details the things he's grown to love about her: overusing 'so', when wisps of her hair cover her face, her eyes... Simply knowing her the best thing that has happened to him. He then, in his relentlessly narciscistic way, says it's mostly because she likes him. As he turns to get the ring, she tells him he was almost successful.

The end of the six year timeline, like the other snipets, are interspersed throughout. Piecing them together, Dell has finally responded after months of Kimberley wanting to see him. It has been a long time they've not seen one another, since before their second, over-the-phone breakup. Using his keen observational skills, he correctly guesses she's engaged to Jack, as boxes are filled of worn kitchen paraphernalia, there's a photo of them and her ring finger has recently had a ring on it.

Dell tells her about his recent dreams, a non-chronological stream of mostly past events, and says he can't imagine being able to exist in the world without her love. The film fades to black.

Cast
 Emmy Rossum as Kimberly
 Justin Long as Dell
 Kayla Servi as Stephanie
 Eric Winter as Josh

Production
Emmy Rossum and Justin Long joined the cast of the film in early June 2013 to play the lead roles.

Filming
Filming began in mid-June 2013 in the Los Angeles area.

Release
The film had its world premiere at the LA Film Festival on June 13, 2014. The film went on to screen at the Twin Cities Film Fest on October 22, 2014. on October 28, 2014, it was announced IFC Films had acquired all distribution rights to the film. The film was released on December 5, 2014, in a limited release and through video on demand.

Reception
Rotten Tomatoes gives the film a score of 41% based on reviews from 29 critics.

Variety called it a "misfire" but praised the lead performances. /Film praised the film overall but criticized the main character Dell for bordering on pretentiousness, and also criticized the writing as being slightly indulgent.

References

External links
 

2014 romantic comedy-drama films
2014 films
American romantic comedy-drama films
Comets in film
Films scored by Daniel Hart
Films shot in Los Angeles
2014 directorial debut films
2010s English-language films
2010s American films